Ryo is an unincorporated community in Gordon County, in the U.S. state of Georgia.

History
A post office called Ryo was in operation from 1894 until 1904. The name may be derived from Spanish, meaning "river".

References

Unincorporated communities in Gordon County, Georgia
Unincorporated communities in Georgia (U.S. state)